Mak Chun Hung, also known as Brother Hung, is a Hong Kong composer who wrote the original score for hundreds of films and TV series in Hong Kong, mainland China, and Taiwan.

Filmography

Films (incomplete)

Burning Paradise (1994)
Ancient Chinese Whorehouse (1994)
Drunken Master III (1994)
Legendary Couple (1995)
Ebola Syndrome (1996)
All of a Sudden (1996)
97 Aces Go Places (1997)
Up for the Rising Sun (1997)
Troublesome Night (1997)
Troublesome Night 2 (1997)
Troublesome Night 3 (1998)
Troublesome Night 4 (1998)
Fascination Amour (1999)
Troublesome Night 5 (1999)
Troublesome Night 6 (1999)
Troublesome Night 7 (2000)
Troublesome Night 8 (2000)
I.Q. Dudettes (2000)
Troublesome Night 9 (2001)
Troublesome Night 10 (2001)
Troublesome Night 11 (2001)
Troublesome Night 12 (2001)
Headlines (2001)
Prison on Fire – Life Sentence (2001)
The Hidden Enforcers (2002)
Happy Family (2002)
A Wicked Ghost III: The Possession (2002)
Troublesome Night 13 (2002)
Troublesome Night 14 (2002)
Troublesome Night 15 (2002)
Troublesome Night 16 (2002)
Troublesome Night 17 (2002)
Troublesome Night 18 (2003)
Troublesome Night 19 (2003)
The Secret Society - Boss (2003)
Man in Blues (2003)
Osaka Wrestling Restaurant (2004)
Shaolin vs. Evil Dead (2004)
Everlasting Regret (2005)
The Ghost Inside (2005)
Cocktail (2006)
Whispers and Moans (2007)
Gong Tau: An Oriental Black Magic (2007)
True Women for Sale (2008)
The First 7th Night (2009)
Turning Point (2009)
Coweb (2009)
Break Up Club (2010)
All's Well, Ends Well 2010 (2010)
Perfect Wedding (2010)
The Legend Is Born: Ip Man (2010)
The Woman Knight of Mirror Lake (2011)
Turning Point 2 (2011)
Love Lifting (2012)
Ip Man: The Final Fight (2013)
Gangster Payday (2014)
Kung Fu Angels (2014)
Sara (2015)
An Inspector Calls (2015)
The Mobfathers (2016)
Nessun Dorma (2016)
Shock Wave (2017)
The Sleep Curse (2017)
77 Heartbreaks (2017)
Always Be with You (2017)

TV series (incomplete)

The Legendary Siblings (1999)
Crouching Tiger, Hidden Dragon (2001)
Legendary Fighter: Yang's Heroine (2001)
Lavender (2002)
The Young Wong Fei Hung (2002)
My Fair Princess III (2003)
The Royal Swordsmen (2005)
Chinese Paladin (2005)
The Proud Twins (2005)
The Little Fairy (2006)
The Young Warriors (2006)
The Fairies of Liaozhai (2007)
Chinese Paladin 3 (2009)
A Weaver on the Horizon (2010)
Swords of Legends (2014)
Legend of Fragrance (2015)
The Lost Tomb (2015)
The Journey of Flower (2015)
The Mystic Nine (2016)
Let's Shake It (2017)
The Legend of Dugu (2017)
The Destiny of White Snake (2018)

Awards
30th Hong Kong Film Awards
Nominated, Hong Kong Film Award for Best Original Film Score (for Break Up Club)

References

External links

Living people
Hong Kong film score composers
Year of birth missing (living people)